Belan is a surname. Notable people with the surname include:

Albert Belan (1930–2011), US Democratic politician
Alexey Belan (born 1987), Russian-Latvian hacker
Jaroslav Beláň (born 1981), Slovak soccer player
Neno Belan (born 1960), Croatian rock musician
Tatyana Belan (born 1982), Belarusian rhythmic gymnast
Viktor Belan (born 1981), birth name of Dima Bilan, Russian singer

See also